In taxonomy, Halogeometricum (common abbreviation: Hgm.) is a genus of the Haloferacaceae.

References

Further reading

Scientific journals

Scientific books

Scientific databases

External links

Type strain of Halogeometricum borinquense at BacDive -  the Bacterial Diversity Metadatabase

Archaea genera
Taxa described in 1998